Murió el sargento Laprida is a 1937  Argentine film directed by Tito Davison.

Cast
 Mario Danesi
 Alberto de Mendoza (as Alberto Mendoza)
 Maria Esther Duckse
 Celia Gámez

External links

1937 films
1930s Spanish-language films
Argentine black-and-white films
1930s Argentine films